Régine Zylberberg (born Rachelle Zylberberg; 26 December 1929 – 1 May 2022), often known mononymously as Régine, was a Belgian-born French singer and nightclub impresario. She dubbed herself the "Queen of the Night".

Early life
Rachelle Zylberberg was born in Anderlecht, Belgium, to Polish Jewish parents, Joseph Zylberberg and Tauba Rodstein. She spent much of her early life in hiding from the Nazis in occupied wartime France. Abandoned in infancy by her unwed mother who moved to Argentina, she was 12 when her father was arrested by the Nazis. She hid in a convent, where she was reportedly beaten.  After the war, she sold bras in the streets of Paris. Her father, Joseph, managed to survive the war. He opened a cafe in Paris's Belleville neighborhood.

Career 
Known as Régine, she became a torch singer; by 1953, she was a nightclub manager in Paris. She is attributed with the invention of the modern-day discothèque, by virtue of creating a new dynamic atmosphere at Paris' Whisky à Gogo, with the ubiquitous jukebox replaced by disc jockeys utilizing linked turntables.

In 1957, she opened Chez Régine in the Latin Quarter, which became the place to be seen for visiting celebrities, socialites and royalty. As Zylberberg's celebrity expanded she established other venues under the name Chez Régine's in London, New York City, Monte Carlo and elsewhere. These were ultra-selective venues in prime urban locations, all featuring her signature "disco-style" layout. Zylberberg's Paris Whisky à Gogo became the inspiration for the later establishment of the Whisky a Go Go nightclub in Los Angeles. She also established Jimmy'z, a nightclub in Monaco, in 1974.

In the 1970s, Zylberberg moved to New York and lived in a suite of the Delmonico Hotel. She opened Regine's nightclub on the ground floor of the hotel in 1976. The club served food under the direction of French chef Michel Guérard. In the 1970s, she designed a line of "Ready-to-Dance" evening clothes which were proof against wrinkling and so could be packed, which were sold at Bloomingdale's. In 1988, she was in charge of the Ledoyen Restaurant on the Champs-Élysées in Paris.

On 22 April 1996, Zylberberg and her son were arrested for refusing to comply with crew requests and smoking on an American Airlines flight. It was alleged that, though she was travelling economy, Régine had demanded a first-class upgrade, which the airline declined. In June 2011, she appeared as Solange in Follies at the Kennedy Center in Washington, D.C. She lived with her husband in Saint-Tropez.

Family 
She had one son, Lionel, from her first husband Leon Rothcage, whom she married when she was 16.

Death 
Zylberberg died on 1 May 2022, according to her granddaughter.

References

External links
 
 
 

1929 births
2022 deaths
Holocaust survivors
20th-century Belgian businesspeople
20th-century French singers
20th-century French women singers
21st-century French women singers
20th-century French businesswomen
20th-century French businesspeople
Belgian emigrants to France
Belgian expatriates in the United States
Belgian Jews
Belgian people of Polish-Jewish descent
French film actresses
La Ferme Célébrités participants
Nightclub owners
People from Etterbeek
Torch singers
Burials at Père Lachaise Cemetery